The canton of Besançon-6 is an administrative division of the Doubs department, eastern France. It was created at the French canton reorganisation which came into effect in March 2015. Its seat is in Besançon.

It consists of the following communes:
 
Besançon (partly)
Beure
Boussières
Busy
Larnod
Montferrand-le-Château
Osselle-Routelle
Pugey
Thoraise
Torpes
Vorges-les-Pins

References

Cantons of Doubs